Magnolia hodgsonii (syn. Talauma hodgsonii), known in Chinese as gai lie mu is a species of Magnolia native to the forests of the Himalaya and southeastern Asia, occurring in Bhutan, southwestern China, Tibet, northeastern India, northern Myanmar, Nepal, and Thailand. It grows at moderate altitudes of 850–1500 m with a subtropical climate.

It is a small evergreen tree up to 15 m tall. The leaves are obovate-oblong, 20–50 cm long and 10–13 cm broad, with a leathery texture. The flowers are fragrant, with nine tepals up to 9 cm long, the inner tepals white, the outer ones greenish; they are produced in April to May. The fruit is 13–15 cm long, composed of an aggregate of 40-80 follicles.

The wood is "very soft and worthless". Like almost all Himalayan Magnoliaceae, M. hodgsonii flourishes in a stiff clay soil.

References

External links
Flora of China: Magnoliaceae. Treats species as Talauma hodgsonii.
Plant Novelties: Talauma hodgsonii from Mildred E. Mathias Botanical Garden newsletter

hodgsonii
Flora of Tibet
Flora of Yunnan
Trees of Nepal
Flora of East Himalaya
Flora of Myanmar
Flora of Thailand